Wolfhalden is a municipality in the canton of Appenzell Ausserrhoden in Switzerland.

History

Wolfhalden, Heiden and Lutzenberg originally were parts of a single municipality named the Kurzenberg. Around 1650 Wolfhalden and Heiden could not agree about control over the local church. This led to the creation of a church in each village in 1652, making them independent. In 1658 the Kurzenberg was split into the three separate municipalities in defiance of the canton government; their borders were officially established in 1666-7.

Geography
Of this area, 58% is used for agricultural purposes, while 30.5% is forested. Of the rest of the land, 11.4% is settled (buildings or roads) and the remainder (0.1%) is non-productive (rivers, glaciers or mountains).

Demographics
Wolfhalden has a population of 1,719, of which about 11.3% are foreign nationals.  Over the last 10 years the population has decreased at a rate of -4.3%.  Most of the population speaks German  (94.4%), with Serbo-Croatian being second most common ( 1.0%) and Italian being third ( 0.9%).

, the gender distribution of the population was 51.2% male and 48.8% female.  The age distribution, in Wolfhalden is; 138 people or 8.2% of the population are between 0–6 years old.  197 people or 11.7% are 6-15, and 90 people or 5.3% are 16-19.  Of the adult population, 70 people or 4.1% of the population are between 20–24 years old.  483 people or 28.6% are 25-44, and 428 people or 25.3% are 45-64.  The senior population distribution is 211 people or 12.5% of the population are between 65–79 years old, and  72 people or 4.3% are over 80.

In the 2007 federal election the FDP received 65.1% of the vote.

In Wolfhalden about 74.6% of the population (between age 25-64) have completed either non-mandatory upper secondary education or additional higher education (either university or a Fachhochschule).

Wolfhalden has an unemployment rate of 1.8%.  , there were 65 people employed in the primary economic sector and about 29 businesses involved in this sector.  372 people are employed in the secondary sector and there are 26 businesses in this sector.  175 people are employed in the tertiary sector, with 54 businesses in this sector.

The historical population is given in the following table:

Heritage sites of national significance
The  Alte Mühle Wolfhalden (The Old Mill at Wolfhalden) is listed as a heritage site of national significance.

References

External links
 Official Page (German)

Cultural property of national significance in Appenzell Ausserrhoden
Municipalities of Appenzell Ausserrhoden